Yelena Lebedeva (born November 13, 1977) is an Uzbekistani sprint canoer who competed in the mid-1990s. She was eliminated in the semifinals of the K-4 500 m event at the 1996 Summer Olympics in Atlanta.

External links
Sports-Reference.com profile

1977 births
Canoeists at the 1996 Summer Olympics
Living people
Olympic canoeists of Uzbekistan
Uzbekistani female canoeists